The Secret Team: The CIA and Its Allies in Control of the United States and the World is a book by L. Fletcher Prouty, a former colonel in the US Air Force, first published by Prentice-Hall in 1973.

Publication history
After initial publication in 1973, Prentice-Hall republished The Secret Team in 1992 and 1997. The book was published again in 2008 and 2011 by Skyhorse Publishing, the latter edition including an introduction by Jesse Ventura.

Reception
In Studies in Intelligence, an official journal and flagship publication of the Central Intelligence Agency, Walter Pforzheimer described reading the book as "like trying to push a penny with one's nose through molten fudge." Despite what he grants as Prouty's "considerable background and knowledge," he says the book is punctuated by "faulty recollections" and "unwarranted conclusions." In a later issue, a staff writer provides a retrospective of books reviewed in Studies in Intelligence and wonders aloud "whether word ever got back to [Prouty]."

Washington Monthly magazine noted that "marvelous anecdotes about the CIA's dirty-trick department are accompanied by a troubling overstatement best suggested by the subtitle, "The CIA and Its Allies in Control of the United States and the World."

Assassination researcher and former Office of Strategic Services officer Harold Weisberg was less than enthusiastic about Prouty’s book. He was particularly turned off by the claim that Daniel Ellsberg was a CIA agent: "He hemmed and hawed a bit on this when confronted with an unequivocal denial made by E. to Fred Graham and to Prouty by phone. Thus he looses the legitimate point."

See also
 Brought to Light
 Business Plot
 Conspiracy theory
 Military-industrial complex
 The Power Elite

References

External links
Full text available at Internet Archive
 Full text available at ratical.org

Further reading
Berlet, Chip. "Populist Party/Liberty Lobby Recruitment of Anti-CIA Critics." Right Woos Left. Political Research Associates, February 22, 1994. Archived from the original.

1973 non-fiction books
Non-fiction books about the assassination of John F. Kennedy
Non-fiction books about the Central Intelligence Agency
American non-fiction books
Prentice Hall books